The Syrmia County was an administrative unit (county) of the medieval Kingdom of Hungary in the Middle Ages. It was established in the 13th century, and included most of what is today Serbian Syrmia. It was subordinated to the Banate of Macsó. It was conquered by the Ottomans in 1526.

Geography
The medieval county was situated east of the Laćarak–Susek line and east of the neighbouring Vukovar County in modern-day Croatia, and as it was surrounded by the Danube and Sava rivers, except for in the west, it was regarded an island. The county borders largely correspond to the modern-day Srem District in northwestern Serbia.

History
The Theme of Sirmium was taken over by the Hungarians in the late 11th century, and Syrmia became contested between the Byzantines and Hungarians over the century. Manuel I Komnenos retrieved Syrmia in 1162, defended it in 1167, but eventually lost it to Béla III in the 1180s. Its governorship was placed under that of the Banate of Macsó in the 13th century.

Up until January 1229, the Syrmia County was, in an ecclesiastical sense, subordinated as an archdiocese to the Archbishopric of Kalocsa. Then, Pope Gregory IX permitted the establishment of a new bishopric with seat in Bánmonostor (present-day Banoštor).

After Serbian ruler Stefan Dragutin entered dynastic relations with Hungary, he received in 1284, among other territories, Belgrade, and Mačva, which was known as ulterior Sirmia in Papal documents. Dragutin was known as the "Syrmian king". The Syrmia County was often mentioned in Hungarian charters during Stefan Dragutin's reign in "Syrmia" (1284–1316), as a county in which the kings gave estates to its nobility. At the time when the Syrmia County was ostensibly under Serbian rule, Charles I of Hungary was active in it twice, issuing charters on 1 September 1308 in Pétervárad (present-day Petrovaradin), and in February 1314 in Szávaszentdemeter (present-day Sremska Mitrovica) and Pétervárad.

Syrmia was conquered by the Ottomans three decades after their conquest of Macsó in 1496, with the Battle of Mohács (1526) that led to the collapse of Hungary, and Ottoman rule in Pannonia, and subsequently, further into Europe.

Counts
The head of the county was titled ispán (Slavic: župan) — count (comes).

See also
Syrmia County

References

Sources

 
 
 
 
 
 
 
 
 
 
 

 
 
 

Counties of the Kingdom of Hungary in the Middle Ages
History of Syrmia
States and territories established in the 13th century
Medieval history of Vojvodina
Medieval Serbia
States and territories disestablished in 1526